The Death of Louis XIV is a 2016 historical drama film directed by Albert Serra and starring Jean-Pierre Léaud. Set in 1715, it depicts the final days of Louis XIV of France. The film had its world premiere at the 2016 Cannes Film Festival on 19 May 2016. It was released in France on 2 November 2016.

Plot
Louis XIV lies in his bed. Because of the gangrene, his foot becomes blackened.

Cast

Production
Director Albert Serra and producer Thierry Lounas wrote the screenplay for the film. Jean-Pierre Léaud played the lead role. For the film, Albert Serra did not have any rehearsals. Filming took place in the surroundings of the Château de Hautefort in 2015. It took 15 days to shoot the film in total.

Release
The film had its world premiere at the 2016 Cannes Film Festival on 19 May 2016. It was released in France on 2 November 2016.

Reception

Critical response
On review aggregator website Rotten Tomatoes, the film holds an approval rating of 88% based on 56 reviews, and an average rating of 6.9/10. The website's critical consensus reads, "The Death of Louis XIV will frustrate viewers out of sync with its deliberate pace, but those with the patience to settle in may be rewarded with a thoughtful, finely detailed drama." On Metacritic, the film has a weighted average score of 76 out of 100, based on 16 critics, indicating "generally favorable reviews".

Boyd van Hoeij of The Hollywood Reporter called the film "[Albert Serra's] most accessible work to date." Glenn Kenny of The New York Times wrote, "As for Mr. Serra, while he often enjoys playing the foppish provocateur in his interviews, his film is sober, meticulous and entirely convincing in its depiction of period and mortality." Ben Kenigsberg of Variety wrote, "As minimalist as Serra's films can be, they are rarely boring, and often given to wry wit."

Peter Bradshaw of The Guardian gave the film 5 out of 5 stars, writing, "At 73, Jean-Pierre Léaud gives what could be the performance of his career as Louis XIV." Allan Hunter of Screen International also commented that "It is easily the actor's best role and most noteworthy performance in some time."

Accolades

References

External links
 Official website
 
 

2016 films
2010s historical drama films
2010s French-language films
French historical drama films
Portuguese historical drama films
Spanish historical drama films
Films directed by Albert Serra
Films about Louis XIV
Films set in the 1710s
Films featuring a Best Actor Lumières Award-winning performance
2016 drama films
2010s Spanish films
2010s French films